Harazpey may refer to:
Harazpey-ye Gharbi Rural District
Harazpey-ye Jonubi Rural District
Harazpey-ye Shomali Rural District